Pamgarh is a town in Janjgir-Champa district, Chhattisgarh, India. It is one of the 36 Garh of Chhattisgarh state. Pamgarh is on  National Highway 200 National Highway 200 (India) and the Garh (fort) is visible from the road. Pamgarh hosts a police station. Nearby villages are Loharsi and Kharod which is famous for various ponds. Archeological items found during excavations include extended spinal cords.

Geography
It is located at an altitude of 288 m above MSL.

Location
The nearest airport is Raipur Airport.

National Highway 200 passes through Pamgarh.

Tourism
Lakshmaneshwar Temple and Dewarghata are tourist attractions in the vicinity. Sheori Narayan is a tourist place nearby. It got the name Sheori Narayan because Lord Rama ate ber (a type of fruit) at this place, with Shabari. So actually it is Shabri+Narayan(Rama).

Mehandi is one of the small village near Pamagarh. It is famous as the location for the temple of Lord Hanumana.

References

External links
 About Pamgarh
 Satellite map of Pamgarh

Cities and towns in Janjgir-Champa district